Eleutherodactylus symingtoni is a species of frog in the family Eleutherodactylidae.
It is endemic to Cuba.
Its natural habitats are subtropical or tropical moist lowland forest, rocky areas, and caves.
It is threatened by habitat loss. It has eyes 50% larger than its closest relative. This indicates special adaptation to its low light environment.

References

symingtoni
Endemic fauna of Cuba
Amphibians described in 1957
Amphibians of Cuba
Taxonomy articles created by Polbot